Arf-GAP with GTPase, ANK repeat and PH domain-containing protein 3 is an enzyme that in humans is encoded by the AGAP3 gene.

References

External links

Further reading